Tony Daniel Frazier (born January 25, 1981), who goes by the stage name Tony Tillman or previously Brothatone, is an American Christian hip hop musician. As Brothatone, he released an EP in 2006, The Gift. As Tony Tillman, Mic Check was released by Reflection Music in 2013, and it is his breakthrough release on the Billboard charts. He followed it up with 2013's The Tillman EP that charted on two Billboard charts. His second studio album, Camden, charted on two Billboard magazine charts.

Early life
Tony Tillman was born, Tony Daniel Frazier, on January 25, 1981, in Camden, Arkansas. Raised in a single-parent home, Tony Tillman was faced with many challenges urban youths face today. As a youth Tony joined the Crips but later left due to religious influence.

He began traveling with Seventh Day Slumber, and opening shows for several CCM and Hip-Hop artists. He has released two successful projects, and will soon release his first official studio album, called Camden, in summer 2015. The album is based on his previous gang involvement. Tillman currently serves with Fellowship Bible in Murfreesboro, Tennessee.

Music career
Tony Tillman started making music in 2006 as Brothatone, releasing The Gift EP. Tony Tillman started using that moniker in 2012. He signed to Reflection Music and released, an album Mic Check  and a follow-up EP The Tillman EP both in 2013 that charted on Billboard charts. His second studio album, Camden, was released on August 7, 2015, from Reflection Music Group. The album charted on two Billboard magazine charts, where it peaked at No. 25 on Christian Albums, and No. 19 on Heatseekers Albums.

Discography

Studio albums

EPs

References

1981 births
Living people
African-American rappers
African-American Christians
Musicians from Arkansas
Performers of Christian hip hop music
Rappers from Arkansas
21st-century American rappers
21st-century African-American musicians
20th-century African-American people